65 (sixty-five)  is the natural number following 64 and preceding 66.

In mathematics
65 is the 23rd semiprime, and the third of the form (5.q). It is an octagonal number. It is also a Cullen number. Given 65, the Mertens function returns 0.

This number is the magic constant of a 5x5 normal magic square:

This number is also the magic constant of n-Queens Problem for n = 5.

65 is the smallest integer that can be expressed as a sum of two distinct positive squares in two ways, 65 = 82 + 12 = 72 + 42.

It appears in the Padovan sequence, preceded by the terms 28, 37, 49 (it is the sum of the first two of these).

65 is a Stirling number of the second kind, the number of ways of dividing a set of six objects into four non-empty subsets.

65 = 15 + 24 + 33 + 42 + 51.

65 is the length of the hypotenuse of 4 different Pythagorean triangles, the lowest number to have more than 2: 652 = 162 + 632 = 332 + 562 = 392 + 522 = 252 + 602. The first two are "primitive", and 65 is the lowest number to be the largest side of more than one such triple.

65 is the number of compositions of 11 into distinct parts.

In science
The atomic number of terbium, a lanthanide

Astronomy
Messier object M65, a galaxy of magnitude 10.5 in the constellation Leo
The New General Catalogue object NGC 65, a spiral galaxy in the constellation Cetus

In music
"65 Love Affair", singer Paul Davis' hit song in 1982
Sammy Hagar re-recorded his hit "I Can't Drive 55", with the 55 changed to 65, in 2001 for NBC's NASCAR broadcasts to reflect higher speed limits; the song was used from 2001 until 2004 to introduce Budweiser Pole Award winners on NBC and TNT broadcasts
65 is a commonly used abbreviation for the Sheffield, UK, post-rock band 65daysofstatic
Referenced in "Heroes and Villains" by the Beach Boys: "At 60 and 5 / I'm very much alive / I've still got the jive / to survive with the Heroes and Villains"
Odd Future group MellowHype has performed a song entitled "65"

In other fields

65 miles per hour is a common speed limit on  expressways in many U.S. states, primarily in the eastern and central United States. (In the western United States, a common speed limit is 70 m.p.h., and in some places it is 75 m.p.h.).
+65 is the code for international direct dial telephone calls to Singapore.
 the traditional age for retirement in the United Kingdom, Germany, the United States, Canada, and several other countries.
in the U.S., the age at which a person is eligible to obtain Medicare.
CVN-65 is the designation of the U.S. Navy's first nuclear-powered aircraft carrier, the USS Enterprise (CVN-65).
65 is the minimum grade or average required to pass an exam, or a class, in some schools.
The setting of the American classic TV series Naked City (1958–1963) was the 65th Precinct in New York City (sometimes referred to as simply "the 65").
65 is the number of the French department Hautes-Pyrénées.
65 is commonly used in names of many dishes of South India cuisine, for instance Chicken 65.
The M-65 field jacket was commonly worn by American troops during the War in Vietnam.
A 65th anniversary is sometimes referred to as a sapphire jubilee.
The AGM-65 Maverick is a mass-produced air-to-ground tactical missile (AGM) designed for close air support against a wide range of targets.

References

Integers